Each "article" in this category is in fact a collection of entries about several stamp issuers, presented in alphabetical order. The entries themselves are formulated on the micro model and so provide summary information about all known issuers.

See the :Category:Compendium of postage stamp issuers page for details of the project.

Compendium of postage stamp issuers (A – Al)
Compendium of postage stamp issuers (Al – Aq)
Compendium of postage stamp issuers (Ar – Az)
Compendium of postage stamp issuers (Ba – Be)
Compendium of postage stamp issuers (Be – Br)
Compendium of postage stamp issuers (Br – Bz)
Compendium of postage stamp issuers (Brit – British)
Compendium of postage stamp issuers (Ca – Ce)
Compendium of postage stamp issuers (Ce – Ch)
Compendium of postage stamp issuers (Ci – Co)
Compendium of postage stamp issuers (Co – Cz)
Compendium of postage stamp issuers (Da – Dz)
Compendium of postage stamp issuers (Ea – Ez)
Compendium of postage stamp issuers (Fa – Fz)
Compendium of postage stamp issuers (Ga – Ge)
Compendium of postage stamp issuers (Gh – Gz)
Compendium of postage stamp issuers (Ha – Hz)
Compendium of postage stamp issuers (Ia – In)
Compendium of postage stamp issuers (Io – Iz)
Compendium of postage stamp issuers (Ja – Jz)
Compendium of postage stamp issuers (Ka – Kh)
Compendium of postage stamp issuers (Ki – Kz)
Compendium of postage stamp issuers (La – Lz)
Compendium of postage stamp issuers (Ma – Md)
Compendium of postage stamp issuers (Me – Mz)
Compendium of postage stamp issuers (Na – Ni)
Compendium of postage stamp issuers (Ni – Nz)
Compendium of postage stamp issuers (Oa – Oz)
Compendium of postage stamp issuers (Pa – Pl)
Compendium of postage stamp issuers (Po – Pz)
Compendium of postage stamp issuers (Qa – Qz)
Compendium of postage stamp issuers (Ra – Rz)
Compendium of postage stamp issuers (Sa – Sb)
Compendium of postage stamp issuers (Sc – Sl)
Compendium of postage stamp issuers (Sm – So)
Compendium of postage stamp issuers (Sp – Sz)
Compendium of postage stamp issuers (Ta – To)
Compendium of postage stamp issuers (To – Tz)
Compendium of postage stamp issuers (Ua – Uz)
Compendium of postage stamp issuers (Va – Vz)
Compendium of postage stamp issuers (Wa – Wz)
Compendium of postage stamp issuers (Xa – Yz)
Compendium of postage stamp issuers (Za – Zz)